Kambakhsh is a surname that may refer to:

Muhammad Kam Bakhsh (1667–1709), youngest son of the sixth Mughal emperor Aurangzeb
Abdossamad Kambakhsh (1902 or 1903–1971), also known as the Red Prince, Iranian communist and political activist who was the son of a Qajar prince
Sayed Pervez Kambaksh (born 1984), Afghan journalist who was sentenced to death for blasphemy in 2008 but received amnesty in 2009